"Fly Me to the Moon" is a song written by Bart Howard and made famous by Frank Sinatra.

Fly Me to the Moon may also refer to:

 Fly Me to the Moon (film), a 2008 animated feature
 Fly Me to the Moon (Bobby Womack album), 1969
 Fly Me to the Moon (Michael Feinstein album), 2010
 Fly Me to the Moon... The Great American Songbook Volume V, a 2010 album by Rod Stewart
 Fly Me to the Moon (manga), a manga series by Kenjiro Hata
 An episode of the anime series Planetes
 An episode of the 1960s TV series I Dream of Jeannie
 An episode of the 2003 TV series Teenage Mutant Ninja Turtles
 The fanzine of Middlesbrough F.C.
 FlyMe2TheMoon, the first mobile game developed by the Chinese video game developer miHoYo.